RO2 can stand for one of the following:
 Red Orchestra 2: Heroes of Stalingrad
 Ragnarok Online 2: Legend of the Second
 Ragnarok Online 2: The Gate of the World, the cancelled version of the above game
 Organic peroxide or other compounds with the peroxide group
 , an Imperial Japanese Navy submarine commissioned in 1920 and stricken in 1932